Signs is an American reggaeton duet from Springfield, Massachusetts. Originally a trio, the group eventually became a duo composed of Yarimar Huertas and Yalixia Figueroa.

Biography

History
The group was originated by member Yarimar, Tarrah & Kiara for a fifth grade talent show. Yarimar's mother, Margie Rosario, set about developing an act based on their singing and dancing, under the name Spring Girls (because of Springfield), which included Yarimar, Kiara smith & Tarrah Garvy. The girls performed a medley of songs popular at the time (Brandy's "Have You Ever?", Britney Spears's "...Baby One More Time", Monica's "Angel of Mine", Cher's "Believe", and TLC's "No Scrubs").

The girls enjoyed their time together so much that after the talent show the girls decided to cement the band. Margie Rosario became the girls’ manager and decided on keeping the girls unsigned until they turned 18. The girls went through several name changes and line-up changes between 2000 and 2006. Eventually the girls settled on the name Signs because the girls all had different astrological signs.

In late 2006 the band featured lead singer Yakasty Abreu, Elizabeth Espiritusanto, Syntasia Gray, LaKeya Wilson, Annie Lee & Shannon Johnson. This particular line-up was short lived when member Rashell Gordon was added to the group. Before this all member changes in the group seemed friendly but disputes between Shannon and the other girls caused the group to temporarily split. Yarimar rejoined with Syntasia and new members Stephanie Rosado (who was Yari’s cousin) and Veronica Colon (who was Stephanie's brother's girlfriend).

Due to her pregnancy, Veronica Colon has left the group and manager Margie has replaced her with 17-year-old Yalixia Figueroa. Syntasia Gray and Stephanie Rosado also have left but the girls decided on making the band a duo only.

Solo projects
During the years the girls have been together some of them have also done some solo endeavors.

Yakasty Abreu and Elizabeth Espiritusanto have done several solo performances outside of the band and have stated that "If things don't work out with the girls then we can always do our own solo thing."

Yarimar Huertas considers her vocal skills to be very weak and probably wouldn’t be a singer on her own. She has however gone into the field of modeling and at one point was a Barbizon model.

Syntasia Gray has also done solo singing projects. Besides music Syntasia is also a published poet.

Yalixia Figueroa has also stepped into the field of modeling and has done several runway shows.

Demo songs
Between 2005 and 2007 the girls have been in the studio recording songs. Even when members were changed no song was re-recorded to include new vocals. The list of songs are:

 "A Fool's Game"
 "Angel" (Amanda Perez cover)
 "Birthday"
 "Bring Me Along"
 "Down Low"
 "Everyday"
 "Girl Talk"
 "Go (It's Your B'day)"
 "Got Me Hooked"
 "Hottest Chicks in the Game"
 "I Love You!"

 "I'm Goin' Dance"
 "I'm Gonna Tell"
 "It Ain't the Same"
 "Play Me Your Love"
 "Pray Baby"
 "Signs" (Beyoncé cover)
 "Struggle"
 "Takin’ Me Over"
 "To Whom It May Concern"
 "You Got To Love It"
 "You Gotta Be"

Live covers
The band frequently covers songs from several different female artist including Janet Jackson, Destiny's Child, Rihanna, Brandy, Aaliyah, and Monica. The only exception to this is when the girls make a female version of male songs or do a dance interlude to them while catching their breath.  They have also covered Iron Maiden's Run to the hills.

American dance girl groups
American pop music groups
American rhythm and blues musical groups
Musical groups from Springfield, Massachusetts